Robert L. Jubinville is an American attorney and politician serving as a member of the Massachusetts Governor's Council. He is one of only three "Board Certified Criminal Trial Attorneys" in the Commonwealth of Massachusetts.

Early life and education
Jubinville was born and raised in Holyoke, Massachusetts. By age fourteen, he became involved in The Boys and Girls Club of Greater Holyoke. His fascination with the American judicial system began as a child after watching the television series Perry Mason. Watching the show as a child provided an "escape from a difficult family life and an abusive, alcoholic father", according to Jubinville. Following his graduation from high school, he briefly attended Holyoke Community College before being drafted in 1968 into the United States Army, where he has said he "spent his entire hitch at the Natick Laboratories as a test subject for everything from equipment to new field drugs."

After his service in the Army, Jubinville worked as a Massachusetts State Police officer, and was later promoted to detective. During this time, Jubinville studied at Suffolk University, where he earned an undergraduate degree and Juris Doctor.

Career
Following his tenure as a detective, Jubinville practiced law for over thirty years. He has stated that "his role is to make sure every client gets a fair trial, even if he doesn't like the person." He has been a legal contributor to New England Cable News and continues to work as a trial attorney with his daughter, Sarah.

Governor's Council 
In 2012, Jubinville won a seat on the Massachusetts Governor's Council. Citing a lack of sufficient legal experience, he voted against Governor Deval Patrick's Superior Court nominee, Brockton District Court Judge Angel Kelley Brown. Jubinville said he is concerned about lawyers on the Parole Board "using it as a stepping stone to judgeships".

Jubinville is also an advocate for reforming mandatory minimum drug sentences. When discussing non-violent drug offenders, he notes that it costs $45,000 a year in Massachusetts to house, feed and guard a single inmate per year. He argues that money is better spent on treatment programs.

References

Living people
Military personnel from Massachusetts
Suffolk University alumni
Members of the Massachusetts Governor's Council
Massachusetts Democrats
People from Milton, Massachusetts
Politicians from Holyoke, Massachusetts
1946 births